Die sizilianische Vesper is an 1843 opera by Peter Josef von Lindpaintner premiered in Stuttgart.

Recording
Il Vespro siciliano, Silvia Dalla Benetta, Ana Victoria Pitts, Danilo Formaggia, Cesar Arrieta, Camerata Bach Choir Poznan, Virtuosi Brunensis, Federico Longo, 4 CDs Naxos 2017

References

1843 operas
German-language operas
Operas set in Sicily
War of the Sicilian Vespers
Operas